Will Shakespeare, also known as Life of Shakespeare and William Shakespeare: His Life & Times, was a 1978 historical drama series created and written by John Mortimer. Broadcast in six parts, the series is a dramatisation of the life and times of the great poet William Shakespeare, played by Tim Curry, and was co-produced by Lew Grade's ATV and RAI and distributed internationally by ITC. The two production companies had collaborated the previous year on Jesus of Nazareth.

Cast
 Tim Curry as William Shakespeare
 Ian McShane as Christopher Marlowe
 Nicholas Clay as the Earl of Southampton
 Lynette Davies as the Countess of Southampton
 Paul Freeman as Richard Burbage
 John Normington as Alex Cooke
 Ron Cook as Jack Rice
 Richard Cordery as Henry Condell
 Ronald Herdman as Sam Crosse
 Roger Lloyd-Pack as Jack Heminge
 Patience Collier as Elizabeth I
 Meg Wynn Owen as Anne Shakespeare

Writing
Each episode was based around the creation of a play and the idea of Shakespeare's life influencing his writing was used as the central plot device. As there are few known facts about the life of Shakespeare, Mortimer embellished upon stories or legends about the playwright's life.  These included a supposed apprenticeship with Christopher Marlowe and a homoerotic relationship with the Earl of Southampton.

Mortimer also invented a character whom the Dark Lady of Shakespeare's sonnets was supposedly based upon. The wife of a judge, she falls in love with Shakespeare after seeing his performance as Tybalt in Romeo and Juliet, adding a secondary storyline elaborating on class divisions.

Original Literary Material
In 1977 Hodder and Stoughton published Will Shakespeare as written by John Mortimer, author of the Rumpole series. Coronet published the paperback edition in 1977, .

Video release
The series was initially released on VHS under the title William Shakespeare: His Life & Times. A Region 1 DVD release of the series, by A & E television, was released in 2008, simply titled Will Shakespeare. Network Studio released a Region 2 DVD of the series in 2009 under the same title.

See also
 Will (TV series), a 2017 drama about Shakespeare

References

External links
 BFI screenonline page on Will Shakespeare (1978)
 

1978 British television series debuts
1978 British television series endings
Television series by ITC Entertainment
ITV television dramas
Period television series
Television shows produced by Associated Television (ATV)
English-language television shows
Television shows shot at ATV Elstree Studios